The Thebes Courthouse in Thebes, Illinois, is the former county courthouse of Alexander County. Plans to build the courthouse began in 1845, when the county seat was moved to Thebes from Unity. Architect L. I. Lightner planned the courthouse, which he designed in a Southern Greek Revival style featuring a two-story porch and four front pillars. Contractor Ernstt Barkhausen built the courthouse for $4,400, and the building was completed in 1848. It served as Alexander County's courthouse until the county seat was moved to Cairo in 1860.

The courthouse was added to the National Register of Historic Places on December 26, 1972. It now serves as the headquarters of the Thebes Historical Society.

References

Courthouses on the National Register of Historic Places in Illinois
Government buildings completed in 1848
Buildings and structures in Alexander County, Illinois
County courthouses in Illinois
Greek Revival architecture in Illinois
Historical societies in Illinois
Former courthouses in Illinois
National Register of Historic Places in Alexander County, Illinois